Latvia is a country in Europe. Latvia can also refer to:
Latvian Soviet Socialist Republic (1940–1990)
Latvia (European Parliament constituency)
1284 Latvia -  asteroid
Latvia Peak - mountain in Tajikistan

See also
 :Category:National sports teams of Latvia